The year 1936 was marked, in science fiction, by the following events.

Births and deaths

Births 
 April 19 : Tom Purdom,  American writer
 June 11 :  Bernard Dufossé, French illustrator (died 2016)
 November 18 : Suzette Haden Elgin :  American writer (died 2015)
 November 19 : Wolfgang Jeschke, German writer (died 2015)

Deaths

Events 
 First publication of the British magazine Novae Terrae ; the magazine will be named New Worlds in 1939.

Literary releases

Novels 
 The Cometeers, by Jack Williamson (monthly publication in Astounding).

Stories collections

Short stories 
  Les Mains et la machine (Stenographer's Hands, 1928), translate by Régis Messac.
  La Nourrice automatique (The Psychophonic Nurse, 1928), translate by Régis Messac.
  Les Mains et la machine (The Ivy War, 1930), translate by Régis Messac.

Comics

Movies 
 Flash Gordon, by Frederick Stephani and Ray Taylor.
 Things to Come, by William Cameron Menzies.
 Kosmicheskiy reys (Cosmic Voyage), by Vassili Jouravlev.

Awards 
The main science-fiction Awards known at the present time did not exist at this time.

References

See also 
 1936 in science
 1935 in science fiction
 1937 in science fiction

Science fiction by year

science-fiction